Firew Getahun (born 12 June 1992) is an Ethiopian professional footballer who plays as goalkeeper for Ethiopian Premier League club Dire Dawa City and the Ethiopia national team.

References 

1992 births
Living people
Sportspeople from Addis Ababa
Ethiopian footballers
Ethiopia international footballers
Ethiopian Premier League players
Ethiopian Coffee S.C. players
2021 Africa Cup of Nations players